Tiago Filipe Carvalho de Campos (born 16 March 1999) is a Portuguese marathon swimmer. He competed in the 2020 Summer Olympics.

References

1999 births
Living people
People from Santarém, Portugal
Portuguese male swimmers
Olympic swimmers of Portugal
Swimmers at the 2020 Summer Olympics
Sportspeople from Santarém District